Marishes Road railway station was a railway station on the York and North Midland Railway's branch line to Pickering. It opened on 5 July 1845, and until 1848 was called High Marishes, after the village of that name. It closed on 8 March 1965 (although freight to Pickering continued for a further year).

Since closure the main station buildings have remained intact, with the exception of the small wooden signal box which stood immediately north-east of the level crossing - which is now an exhibition as part of Pickering Station Trail on the NYMR.  All signals have also disappeared, including the fine NER lattice post up home signal.

References

External links
Marishes Road station on navigable 1947 O. S. map

Disused railway stations in North Yorkshire
Beeching closures in England
Railway stations in Great Britain opened in 1845
Railway stations in Great Britain closed in 1965
1845 establishments in England
1965 disestablishments in England
Former York and North Midland Railway stations
George Townsend Andrews railway stations